The 1936 WANFL season was the 52nd season of the Western Australian National Football League. The most conspicuous features were the rise of Claremont to their first finals appearance since entering the WAFL ten years beforehand after having won only forty (plus two draws) of its first 183 games, and the thrilling finals series in which East Perth rose to their first premiership for nine years after holding on to a thrilling struggle for fourth position where all eight clubs were in the running well into August, then winning two finals by a solitary point. In the process the Royals set a record for the most losses by an eventual premiership club in major Australian Rules leagues, but won their last open-age premiership until 1956. The Royals overcame much adversity to win the premiership, including a crippling injury toll and a schedule modified to allow them to tour Victoria, South Australia and Tasmania between 4 July and the first week of August.

George Moloney, famous as a prolific goalscorer, aided Claremont's rise in his new role as a centreman and won the club's fourth Sandover Medal in five seasons, whilst former West Perth key forward Frank Hopkins took Moloney's place at the goalfront to great effect.

The Cardinals, who had won three premierships during the previous four seasons, began a short but extraordinarily steep decline this season, not returning to the finals until 1941 (when they won another premiership) and suffering two wooden spoons and twenty-seven consecutive losses.

Victoria Park, wooden spooners in 1935, reverted to the club's traditional name of 'Perth' after Parliament failed to pass an Act to allow them to acquire Raphael Park to develop a new oval. After a poor beginning the Redlegs improved, but were not again to contest open-age finals until they began three decades of only briefly interrupted success in 1947.

Off the field, 1936 saw the WANFL establish permanent headquarters at Subiaco Oval, whilst the Grand Final was the first game with a new grandstand at the ground.

Home-and-away season

Round 1 (Labour Day)

Round 2

Round 3

Round 4

Round 5

Round 6 (Foundation Day)

Round 7

Round 8

Round 9

Round 10

Round 11

Round 12

Interstate match

Round 13

Round 14 (Labour Day)

Round 15

Round 16

Round 17

Round 18

Round 19

Round 20

Ladder

Finals

First semi-final

Second semi-final

Preliminary final

Grand final

Notes

References

External links
 Official WAFL site
 Western Australian National Football League (WANFL) 1936

West Australian Football League seasons
WANFL season